Weird War, briefly known as Scene Creamers, is an indie rock band based out of Washington, D.C.  The current lineup consists of Ian Svenonius on vocals, Michelle Mae on bass guitar, Alex Minoff on guitar, and Sebastian Thomson on drums.

Weird War was initially formed as an umbrella organization in 2001 to encompass disparate anti-authoritarian groups and to "challenge the idiocy of the new epoch."  While the current lineup appears on the group's first release I'll Never Forget What's His Name, the group's first full length, self-titled release featured Neil Hagerty (of Royal Trux) and Jessica Espeleta (formerly of Love as Laughter) on guitars, and Steve McCarty (later of Dead Meadow) on drums.
    
These collaborators soon left to pursue other programs, and the band became known as The Scene Creamers, with Ian Svenonius on vocals, Michelle Mae on bass, Alex Minoff (of Golden) on guitar, and Blake Brunner on drums.  In this incarnation, the band released I Suck on that Emotion, through Drag City.

After being threatened with a legal suit for the name Scene Creamers by a French graffiti artist collective of the same name, the band reverted to the name Weird War. Since then, its membership has become static, with the addition of Argentine Sebastian Thomson (of the group Trans Am) on drums, and its intent has become more cosmic.

Ideology

Weird War claims that they are "the sole answer to the hype-based careerism, empty formalism and vacuity which has infected what was once a genuinely creative underground rock 'n' roll scene."

Such rhetoric however is not necessarily mirrored by the group's lyrical content.  Svenonius told an interviewer "I don't actually like rock and roll lyrics that are political because lyrics are almost irrelevant in rock and roll. What lyrics are is just an incantation, a kind of spell. A political band isn't a band with political lyrics. A political band is a group that's creating a narrative that guides the culture towards, well, towards destroying the ruling class, in whatever way."

In comparison to their own music, Weird War often reference a cookie-cutter aesthetic of other bands and musicians as neo-conservative political forces: "Weird War see the clone nature of the revisionist groups as a direct analogue to the fascism and conformity which defines 21st century America, and their general idiocy an infiltration conspiracy by counter-intelligence forces."

According to Svenonius, Weird War's brief stint as The Scene Creamers was as a result of politically motivated, collective-dream:

Songs like "AK-47" address "the technology gap which faces modern Anti-colonial guerilla  fighters" and that similar songs "could be called a celebration of nationalist resistance movements worldwide which fight Anglo-American imperialism."

Discography

Studio albums

Weird War (Drag City) (2002)
I Suck on that Emotion (as Scene Creamers) (Drag City) (2003)
If You Can't Beat 'Em, Bite 'Em (Drag City) (2004)
Illuminated by the Light (Drag City) (2005)

DVD / Video

appears on Burn to Shine 01: Washington DC 01.14.2004 (Trixie) (2005)

7 inch singles
{|
|-
|valign="top"|
|valign="top"|

|}

Appearances on compilations
{| class="wikitable"
!align="left|Year
!align="left|Title
!align="left|Track(s)
!align="left|Label
!align="left|Other
|-
|2002
|Colonel Jeffrey Pumpernickel - A Concept Album
|
"I'll Never Forget What's His Name"
|Off Records
|
|-
|2003
|No Disco - Mutant Dance Happening
|
"AK-47"
|S.H.A.D.O. Records
|
|-
|2005
|Drag City A to Z
|
"Girls Like That"
|Drag City Records
|
|-
|2005
|Burn to Shine 01: Washington DC 01.14.2004 (DVD)
|
Performance of"AK-47"
|Trixie DVD
|Ex-Nation of Ulysses, Make-Up, and Cupid Car Club member James Canty also appears as part of French Toast.
|-
|2006
|Pancake Mountain (TV)(Episodes 5 & 6)
|
Performance of"Girls Like That"
|Monkey Boy Studios
|Washington, D.C.-based Public-access television cable TV children's show featuring performances by many indie rock bands.
|}

DVD / Video
{|
|-
|valign="top"|
|valign="top"|

|}

Comics
{|
|-
|valign="top"|
|valign="top"|

|}

References

External links
Official website
Drag City page

Drag City (record label) artists
Indie rock musical groups from Washington, D.C.
Musical groups established in 2001